The 2000 Georgetown Tigers football team was an American football team that represented Georgetown College of Georgetown, Kentucky, as a member of the Mid-South Conference (MSC) during the 2000 NAIA football season. In their fifth season under head coach Bill Cronin, the Tigers compiled a 14–0 record (8–0 against conference opponents) and won the NAIA national championship, defeating , 20–0, in the NAIA National Championship Game.

Schedule

References

Georgetown Tigers
Georgetown Tigers football seasons
NAIA Football National Champions
College football undefeated seasons
Georgetown Tigers football